The German Student Union (abbreviated DSt) from 1919 until 1945, was the merger of the general student committees of all German universities, including Danzig, Austria and the former German universities in Czechoslovakia.

The DSt was founded during the Weimar Republic period as a democratic representation of interests. It experienced serious internal conflicts in the early 1920s between the Republican minority and the völkisch majority wing. It was dominated from 1931 onward by the National Socialist German Students' League, which was merged on 5 November 1936 under Gustav Adolf Scheel with the DSt, played a large part in the Nazi book burnings and was eventually banned in 1945 as a Nazi organization.

On 6 May 1933, members of the DSt made an organised attack on the Institute of Sex Research in Berlin's Tiergarten area. A few days later, the institute's library and archives were hauled out and burned in the streets of the Opernplatz. Around 20,000 books and journals, and 5,000 images, were destroyed.

Chairmen

See also
Sozialistischer Deutscher Studentenbund (1946–)

References

Student organizations established in 1919
Organizations disestablished in 1945
Nazi Party organizations
Student societies in Germany
Organizations based in the Weimar Republic

Education in Nazi Germany